The Ratbites From Hell were a West Country rock band active between 1972 and 1975, many of whose members subsequently played in key bands of the later 70's, as punk and new wave revived the London and New York music scenes.

The basic Ratbites line-up was Huw Gower and John Perry on guitar/vocals, Roy Sundholm on bass/vocals, Nick Howell and/or Alan Platt on drums, 'Big' Pete Thorpe on vocals and Pete Biles on congas,

1972–75
When the psychedelic band Magic Muscle split in January 1973, remaining members Huw Gower and Pete Biles recruited guitarist John Perry, bassist Roy Sundholm and drummer Nick Howell to fulfill existing MM gig commitments; their nascent band (Over The Hill)'s fourth member, singer/songwriter Pete Roe served out the remaining six months of his contract as a journalist with a national daily. 
   
Joined by lead singer 'Big' Pete Thorpe, this temporary line-up became MM 2 and were soon playing shows with Hawkwind. Dave Brock rated the new band and recommended them to producer Don Paul who cut two songs on them including Huw Gower's majestic 'Sparkle'. MM2's last appearance was at the l Trentishoe Festival in Devon (July '73) after which the MM name was retired for a while.

Gower formed 'Stroll On', joined by Howell. The two groups jammed together in the summer of 1974 and the same core musicians who played at Trentishoe once more reformed as The Ratbites From Hell and played shows throughout the UK.

In August 1975 The Ratbites toured the Netherlands, playing a dozen cities from Groningen to Rotterdam. They also recorded for United Artists.  The band has never officially split up, though shows these days are rare.  A line-up was last seen playing at The Nashville Rooms in London in early 1978.

Subsequent careers
Huw Gower was spotted by Will Birch at the Ratbites Nashville gig,] and recruited to play guitar for The Records. Gower co-wrote the groups’ US top 40 chart hit ’Starry Eyes’, cut records with Rachel Sweet, Nick Lowe, The Sinceros, Henry McCulloch, Carlene Carter and in New York with ex-New York Dolls vocalist David Johansen/Buster Poindexter, Graham Parker & Rosanne Cash.  His 1984 solo record 'Guitarophilia', highly rated by the NY Times' music critic Robert Palmer lead to a second career as a producer, a role he'd begun during his spell with The Records and more solo releases; 'Ile de France' in 2000 and 'In Pursuit of Excellence, 2003.  In 2012 he formed IceCream Skyscraper with  'Mad' Mike Cullens. The band's well received first album, 'Granite, With Rainbow Sprinkles' was released later that same year.

Alan Platt formed the Solid Senders with Dr. Feelgood guitarist Wilko Johnson. Their debut album included his original tune 'First Thing in the Morning', featuring his lead vocal.  He and co-writer Simon Climie were signed to Ringo Starr's publishing company, who placed one of their tunes on a single release by Connie Francis (Comme Ci, Comme Ca).  
Subsequently Alan relocated to his native Scotland, where he was active in the blues band 'Bottleneck'.  He died in 2006.

John Perry met Peter Perrett when a drunken Peter Biles fell offstage at a London show in autumn 1975, landing on (future- Only One) Peter Perrett's wife, Xena. From this inauspicious start Perrett and Perry began recording songs at a demo studio in Tooting. Five songs were laid down with Perry playing bass and guitar, Glenn Tilbrook on guitar and Gordon Edwards (Kinks and Pretty Things) on keyboards. Within months drummer Mike Kellie and bassist Alan Mair joined and the Only Ones line-up was finalised in mid-1976.

The Only Ones reformed in 2007 and in the intervening years John's guitar was frequently heard on recordings by The Sisters of Mercy, Robert Palmer, Evan Dando and many more.  He also found time to author three books, including a highly acclaimed analysis of The Rolling Stones' masterpiece 'Exile on Main Street'.

Roy Sundholm released an album of original material which featured Alan Platt on drums.

Nick Howell joined The Snivelling Shits alongside Giovanni Dadomo, Pete Makowski, Barry Myers and sometime bassist Steve Lillywhite. Their album I Can't Come was released on the Damaged Goods label. Nick later joined John's band Decline and Fall. He died in 2005.

By 1977 the various Ratbites had moved on but John and Alan can be heard, separately, on one double album. If any one record reflects the atmosphere of 1976/7, as the London music scene adapted to (or ignored) the challenge of punk, it's probably the Hope & Anchor Front Row Festival. Recorded live over 3 weeks in Nov/December 1977 it features the Only Ones, and the Wilko Johnson Band.

Discography
Album

Ratbite Fever, a bootlegged collection of demos and live tracks by Over The Hill, which included John, Roy and Alan along with Pete Roe, was released by World Wide Records SPM-CD-0006

Zippo Records' former CEO Pete Flanagan has yet to release tracks he cut of originals by Gower, accompanied by Perry, Howell and ex-MM Ade Shaw on bass, and also is thought to have a copy of the UA sessions, featuring Gowers' 'TV Blues'.

On 6 October 2014, Bristol Archive Records debut 'Bristol Boys Make More Noise', a photo book and companion compilation CD featuring many bands active in the Bristol area in the late 1970s and early 1980s.   
The digital release includes the song 'Sparkle', written by Huw Gower and recorded in the summer of 1973.  Produced by Don Paul, this track is, some 41 years after the fact, the debut of The Fabulous Ratbites From Hell as a recording unit.

References

Musical groups from Bristol
Musical groups established in 1972
Musical groups disestablished in 1975